John George Ranson (1 April 1909 – 1992) was an English footballer who played as a centre forward.

Ranson started his career with Norwich City during the 1928–1929 season, but never made an appearance. Between 1930–1936, Ranson played league football for Swansea Town, Chester, Gateshead, Millwall, Carlisle United and Lincoln City. During this period, Ranson also played non-league football for Colwyn Bay United and Burton Town. After leaving Lincoln City, Ranson played non-league football for Blyth Spartans, Spennymoor United, Horden Colliery Welfare and two spells at Durham City.

Ranson's only son J.M. Ranson represented England at Rugby Union.

Sources

1909 births
1992 deaths
English footballers
Association football forwards
Norwich City F.C. players
Swansea City A.F.C. players
Chester City F.C. players
Colwyn Bay F.C. players
Gateshead F.C. players
Millwall F.C. players
Burton Town F.C. players
Carlisle United F.C. players
Lincoln City F.C. players
Blyth Spartans A.F.C. players
Spennymoor United F.C. players
Durham City A.F.C. players
Darlington Town F.C. players
English Football League players
Footballers from Norwich